Simão Morgado (born 4 March 1979) is a male Portuguese swimmer. He is the national record holder of the 50-meter butterfly (long course) and since 1997 and he has beaten the National Record in the 100 meters thirteen times, what makes him one of the greatest swimmers in Portugal's history. Simão Morgado has participated in multiple international competitions and in 2004, at the European Long Course Championships in Madrid, he placed sixth in the 100-meter butterfly. He has raced at four consecutive Summer Olympics, with his best result coming at the 2004 Athens Olympics.

His swimming club is Clube da Natação da Amadora, based in Lisbon.

References
sports-reference

1979 births
Portuguese male butterfly swimmers
Olympic swimmers of Portugal
Swimmers at the 2000 Summer Olympics
Swimmers at the 2004 Summer Olympics
Swimmers at the 2008 Summer Olympics
Swimmers at the 2012 Summer Olympics
Living people